was the lord of Okazaki Castle in Mikawa province, Japan during the Sengoku Period of the 16th century.
He is best known for being the father of Tokugawa Ieyasu, founder of the Tokugawa Shogunate.

Biography
Hirotada was the son of Matsudaira Kiyoyasu (seventh head of the Mikawa Matsudaira clan). He was known in his childhood as Senshōmaru, Senchiyo, and Jirōzaburō.

After his father's assassination in 1535, Hirotada was placed under the protection of a loyal retainer, Abe Sadayoshi. He allied with the Imagawa, and with their help was installed at Okazaki castle. The alliance with them brought him into conflict with the Oda clan. 

In 1540, Oda Nobuhide attacked and took Anjō castle, which was held by the Matsudaira family. Hirotada was assisted by Mizuno Tadamasa. After Anjō castle was taken, Oda Nobuhide's son, Oda Nobuhiro, was installed as the lord of the castle.

In 1541, Hirotada married Mizuno Tadamasa's daughter, Okichi. A son, was born to them a year later, Matsudaira Takechiyo later known as Tokugawa Ieyasu.   

Hirotada joined Imagawa Yoshimoto to fight Oda Nobuhide at the First Battle of Azukizaka in 1542, and were defeated. 

In 1543, his uncle, Matsudaira Nobutaka, rebelled and joined Oda Nobuhide. Hirotada had a serious disagreement with his father-in-law, Mizuno Tadamasa.
Later in 1544, he divorced Tadamasa daughter, Okichi. He then married the daughter of Toda Yasumitsu, Makihime.

Death
In 1549, when his son Matsudaira Takechiyo (later known as Tokugawa Ieyasu) was six years old, Hirotada was murdered by his own vassals, who had been bribed by the Oda clan.

He was posthumously conferred the rank of Dainagon by his son Ieyasu in 1612.

Family

Parents

Wives and concubines

Children

Ancestry

References

Daimyo
1526 births
1549 deaths
Matsudaira clan